The Georgia Open is the Georgia (USA) state open golf tournament, open to both amateur and professional golfers. It is organized by the Georgia section of the PGA of America. It has been played annually since 1954 at a variety of courses around the state.

Winners

2022 Austin Morrison
2021 Matt Nagy
2020 Jonathan Keppler
2019 Barrett Waters
2018 Timothy O'Neal
2017 Paul Claxton
2016 Shad Tuten
2015 Davin White (amateur)
2014 Jay McLuen
2013 Jonathan Fricke
2012 Jonathan Fricke
2011 Jay McLuen
2010 Samuel Del Val
2009 Roberto Castro
2008 Bryant Odom
2007 Jeff Hull
2006 Jared Garrity
2005 Tim Conley
2004 Tim Weinhart
2003 Justin Bolli
2002 Jody Bellflower
2001 Dave Schreyer
2000 Jody Bellflower
1999 Dicky Thompson
1998 Dicky Thompson
1997 Louis Brown
1996 Dave Schreyer
1995 Stephen Keppler
1994 Stephen Keppler
1993 Matt Peterson
1992 Franklin Langham
1991 Gregg Wolff
1990 Mark Jordan
1989 Franklin Langham (amateur)
1988 DeWitt Weaver III (amateur)
1987 Tim Simpson
1986 Gene Sauers
1985 Gene Sauers
1984 Tim Simpson
1983 Gene Sauers
1982 Barry Harwell
1981 Tim Simpson
1980 Tim Simpson, Bob Tway (amateur)
1979 DeWitt Weaver
1978 Larry Nelson
1977 DeWitt Weaver
1976 Paul Moran
1975 Tommy Aaron
1974 Joe Kunes (amateur), Paul Moran
1973 DeWitt Weaver
1972 DeWitt Weaver
1971 George Johnson
1970 Ted Hayes Jr.
1969 Ted Hayes Jr.
1968 Hugh Royer Jr.
1967 Lyn Lott (amateur)
1966 John Ferguson
1965 Steve Melnyk
1964 Dick Cannon
1963 Emory Lee
1962 Jim Stamps
1961 Dick Cline
1960 Tommy Aaron
1959 R. L. Miller
1958 Jim Stamps
1957 Tommy Aaron (amateur)
1956 Hugh Moore
1955 Dick Cline
1954 Charlie Harper

External links
PGA of America – Georgia section
List of winners

Golf in Georgia (U.S. state)
PGA of America sectional tournaments
State Open golf tournaments
Recurring sporting events established in 1954